The list of ship commissionings in 2016 includes a chronological list of all ships commissioned in 2016.


See also

2016